Jack King (13 January 1928 – 7 September 2011) was  a former Australian rules footballer who played with Footscray in the Victorian Football League (VFL).

Notes

External links 
		
		
		
		
		

1928 births
2011 deaths
Australian rules footballers from Victoria (Australia)
Western Bulldogs players
Spotswood Football Club players